We're All Gamblers is a lost  1927 American drama silent film directed by James Cruze and written by John W. Conway and Hope Loring. The film stars Thomas Meighan, Marietta Millner, Cullen Landis, Philo McCullough, Gertrude Claire, Gunboat Smith and Spec O'Donnell. The film was released on September 3, 1927, by Paramount Pictures.

Cast   
Thomas Meighan as Lucky Sam McCarver
Marietta Millner as Carlotta Asche
Cullen Landis as Georgie McCarver
Philo McCullough as Monty Garside
Gertrude Claire as Mrs. McCarver
Gunboat Smith as Gunboat
Spec O'Donnell as Spec

References

External links 
 
 

1927 films
1920s English-language films
Silent American drama films
1927 drama films
Paramount Pictures films
Films directed by James Cruze
American black-and-white films
Lost American films
American silent feature films
1927 lost films
Lost drama films
1920s American films